The Church of Our Lady of Perpetual Help and St. Eugene, popularly known as Iglesia de la Cruz de Carrasco (due to its location at an important crossing in Las Canteras, north-east of Carrasco) is a Roman Catholic parish church in Montevideo, Uruguay.

There was a small chapel around 1943. The present temple was built in a modern sort of Neo-Byzantine style, roughly resembling Haghia Sophia; designed by the architect Horacio Terra Arocena, it was consecrated in 1951. It is dedicated to Our Lady of Perpetual Help and saint Eugene. 

The parish was established on 31 December 1949.

References

1949 establishments in Uruguay
Roman Catholic churches completed in 1951 
Roman Catholic church buildings in Montevideo
Byzantine Revival architecture in Uruguay
20th-century Roman Catholic church buildings in Uruguay